Cressier may refer to:

Cressier, Fribourg, a municipality in the canton of Fribourg, Switzerland
Cressier, Neuchâtel, a municipality in the canton of Neuchâtel, Switzerland